Mike Palm may refer to:

 Mike Palm (baseball) (1925–2011), relief pitcher in Major League Baseball
 Mike Palm (American football) (1899–1974), football player in the National Football League
 Mike Palm, a member of Agent Orange (band)